The women's combined competition of the Sochi 2014 Olympics was held at the Rosa Khutor Alpine Resort near Krasnaya Polyana, Russia, on 10 February at 11:00 MSK for the downhill and at 15:00 MSK for the slalom. Maria Höfl-Riesch won the gold medal.

Results
The downhill race started at 11:00 and the slalom race at 15:00.

References

Combined